Neuronal acetylcholine receptor subunit beta-3 is a protein that in humans is encoded by the CHRNB3 gene.  This gene has been identified as a candidate for predisposition to tobacco dependence.

See also
 Nicotinic acetylcholine receptor

References

Further reading

External links 
 
 

Ion channels
Nicotinic acetylcholine receptors